Le lazzarone, ou Le bien vient en dormant (The Lad from Naples, or Good comes from Sleeping) is an opéra in two acts with music by Fromental Halévy to a libretto by Jules-Henri Vernoy de Saint-Georges. It was premiered on 29 March 1844 at the Paris Opéra.

At the instruction of Léon Pillet, the director of the Opéra, the opera was written as a vehicle for his mistress Rosine Stoltz (who had recently borne him a child). After some severe critical reactions, the opera was not successful and has not been revived.

Performance history
The inappropriate casting of a far-from-splendid 31-year-old portraying a Neapolitan teenager was not appreciated by the Parisian critics. A review in the Revue et gazette musicale sardonically regretted the Opéra's 'dearth of tenors', and noted that the composer was 'forced to do without a timbre of voice so essential to an opera.' Hector Berlioz wrote that 'the orchestration is too grandiose, too pompous, too loud and even too slow for this kind of story.' At the premiere, Stoltz particularly annoyed her rival Julie Dorus-Gras by conspicuously eating macaroni onstage during the latter's aria.

The opera also marked the Paris debut of Lola Montez as an 'Andalusian dancer'. This however proved a disaster; Montez, losing a shoe during one routine, flung it into the boxes. Théophile Gautier wrote 'Mlle. Montez [...] has small feet and shapely legs. Her use of these is quite another matter'.

Roles

Synopsis
Place: Naples
Time:
The lazy Beppo is enamoured of the flower seller Baptista. Mirobolante and Corvo, discovering Baptista's birth certificate, find that she is unaware that she is an heiress to a fortune. They woo her assiduously; Beppo, feeling he has no chance against such wealthy suitors, goes to sleep. Baptista however wakes him and says she much prefers him to the other two. Mirobolante and Corvo try to prevent their marriage by asserting that Baptista is a minor; her birth certificate however shows that she is 21 that very day.

References
Notes

Sources
 Libretto at Gallica website
 Jordan, Ruth (1994). Fromental Halévy, London: Kahn and Averill. 
 Walker, Alan (1988). Franz Liszt: The Virtuoso Years 1811–1847 (revised edition). London: Faber and Faber. 

Operas
1844 operas
Operas by Fromental Halévy
Operas set in Naples
French-language operas
Opéras comiques